State Highway 84 (SH 84) is a South Island state highway in New Zealand.

Route
Known as Wanaka Luggate Highway, it is a two-lane road for its entire length. The road begins at SH 6 to the south of Albert Town and proceeds in a westerly direction past Puzzling World to descend into the township of Wanaka.

Route history
Before being re-gazetted as SH 84 in 1998, the road formed part of State Highway 89, more well known as the Crown Range Road.

See also
List of New Zealand state highways

References

External links
 New Zealand Transport Agency

84
Wānaka
Transport in Otago